Amersham is a London Underground and National Rail station in Amersham in the Chiltern district of Buckinghamshire, England.

Amersham station is a terminus of the London Underground's Metropolitan line. It is 23.7 miles (38.1 km) northwest of Charing Cross, making it the second furthest Underground station from central London and the second most westerly station of the whole London Underground system, after . It is in Travelcard Zone 9 (previously zone D).

Amersham station is also served by Chiltern Railways, which runs trains between London Marylebone and Aylesbury. From Aylesbury a shuttle service to Princes Risborough provides access to through services between Marylebone and Birmingham Snow Hill. The journey times between Amersham and Central London range between 33 and 60 minutes. The journey time between Amersham and Chalfont & Latimer is about three and a half minutes.

History

The station was opened on 1 September 1892 as part of the Metropolitan Railway (Met) extension from Chalfont Road (now Chalfont & Latimer) to Aylesbury. On 12 March 1922, its name was changed to "Amersham & Chesham Bois", but the original name was restored during 1937.

From 16 March 1899, the Great Central Railway served the station through its extension to Marylebone. Consequently, the station became joint Met/GCR owned. On 1 January 1923, the GCR became part of the London and North Eastern Railway (LNER) under the Railways Act 1921, and on 1 July 1933 the Met became part of the London Passenger Transport Board (LPTB), becoming the Metropolitan line of the London Underground. On 1 January 1948, the LNER was nationalised, its share of the station initially coming under the control of the Eastern Region of British Railways, before being transferred to the London Midland Region in 1958.

On 12 September 1960, the tracks from Rickmansworth to Amersham were electrified, partially fulfilling plans first proposed some thirty years earlier. The rolling stock ordered by London Underground as part of this project, the A60 stock, is named after Amersham.

Service changes
When the sectorisation of British Rail took place in 1982, services to Aylesbury on what had by now become the London to Aylesbury Line came under the operation of Network SouthEast. Following the privatisation of British Rail in the early 1990s, these services have been provided by Chiltern Railways.

From December 2010, off-peak Metropolitan line services to and from Amersham were reduced to two per hour, with a corresponding increase in through services on the Chesham branch. This is a return to the historically normal frequency of two Metropolitan trains per hour from the four Metropolitan trains per hour service that had been operating for the previous five years. Including the Chiltern Railways services, Amersham still has four trains an hour to London in total, with extra trains from both operators at peak hours. Metropolitan line services are divided 50:50 between Amersham and Chesham. This is expected to divide park and ride or kiss and ride motorist users more evenly between the two stations and help spread the load on local roads, though the change was made purely for operational reasons.

The station today
The station is located on Station Approach, Amersham. Ticket barriers are in operation at the station.

In 2009, because of financial constraints, Transport for London (TfL) decided to stop work on a project to provide step-free access at Amersham and five other stations, on the grounds that these are relatively quiet stations and some are already one or two stops away from an existing step-free station. In 2017, TfL announced that Amersham station would receive funding for step-free access, and that work would begin in 2018. It was opened in February 2021.

Services
Services at Amersham are operated by Chiltern Railways and London Underground on the Metropolitan line. The off-peak service at the station is:
 2 tph to Aldgate (All Stations)
 2 tph to London Marylebone

Notes and references

Notes

References

Further reading

External links

Official London Underground website
Station on navigable O.S. map

Station
Metropolitan line stations
Tube stations in Buckinghamshire
Railway stations in Buckinghamshire
Former Metropolitan and Great Central Joint Railway stations
Railway stations in Great Britain opened in 1892
Railway stations served by Chiltern Railways
1892 establishments in England